Coelestis Pastor was a papal encyclical issued on 19 November 1687 by Pope Innocent XI in which he condemns the practices of the Quietists, a group of religious separatists led by Miguel de Molinos.

References

External links
 Coelestis Pastor at Papal Encyclicals Online

1687 in Europe
1687 works
Documents of Pope Innocent XI
Papal encyclicals